Jendri Chriestian Pitoy (born 15 January 1981) is an Indonesian footballer. He was a goalkeeper.

He played for the Indonesia national football team as the first team regular. His international debut as a senior national team player was for a friendly match between Indonesia and Malaysia on 26 September 2003 and the match was ended draw 1–1. In Sea Games 2001 he brought U-23 National Team to 4th place after losing 0–1 from Myanmar (3rd place). In Sea Games 2003 in Hanoi, Vietnam he failed to bring U-23 National Team to Semi Final. The team were not qualified from group qualification at first round. In Asian Cup 2007, he played in two matches in group D qualification in Jakarta. Those two matches are Indonesia against Bahrain (won 2–1) and Indonesia against Saudi Arabia (lost 1–2).

Jendri brought his club Persipura Jayapura to win Liga Indonesia together with teammates in his club. At the end of 2012 he joined Persiram Raja Ampat for one season. And now, he plays for  Persebaya Bhayangkara.

National team career
 2001: SEA Games Kuala Lumpur
 2003: SEA Games Hanoi
 2004: Asian Cup, Tiger Cup
 2006: Brunei Merdeka Games in Malaysia
 2007: Asian Cup

Honours
Persipura Jayapura
Winner
 Liga Indonesia: 2005
 Indonesia Super League: 2008–09
 Indonesian Community Shield: 2009

References

External links
 
 

1981 births
Living people
People from Tomohon
Sportspeople from North Sulawesi
Indonesian Christians
Indonesian footballers
Indonesia international footballers
2004 AFC Asian Cup players
2007 AFC Asian Cup players
persma Manado players
Persikota Tangerang players
Perseman Manokwari players
Persija Jakarta players
Persipura Jayapura players
Persib Bandung players
Persiram Raja Ampat players
Bhayangkara F.C. players
PSBS Biak Numfor players
Association football goalkeepers